The Special Security Unit (SSU) is a specialized counterterrorism and security unit of the Sindh Police in Pakistan. It is a Karachi-based unit, with its operational jurisdiction extending throughout Sindh as a whole. It was established in 2010 in response to increased rates of terrorism. The unit reports to the IG Sindh and DIGP Security/Commandant Mr. Maqsood Ahmed is the founding head of the unit.

Services

The SSU provides personal protection to individuals in the following roles:

 President of Pakistan
 Prime Minister of Pakistan 
 Chairman of the Senate of Pakistan
 Speaker of the National Assembly of Pakistan
 Chief Justice of Pakistan
 Visiting heads of state and/or government
 Governors and chief ministers of the provinces of Pakistan and of Azad Kashmir

The SSU also provides security arrangements for ceremonies and public events, carrying out threat level assessment, risk assessment inquiry, and security surveys.

History

Establishment

Centralized Security Headquarter (CSH) was formed on 31 July 2008 with the aim to provide security to important personalities and institutions. On 7 April 2010, the CSH was reorganized to ensure effective span of command and supervision, along with the creation of post SP Security-I to provide security to important personalities. It was reorganized in light of the ambition of SP Maqsood Ahmed to execute the security issues to initiate a change culture in the police unit. Additionally, on 7 July 2010, SSU was formed to handle the security issues on a provincial level. The post of SP Security-I was renamed as AIGP Security Sindh and positioned under the Inspector General of Police, Sindh.

Selection Criteria 
In 2013, SSU began recruiting new candidates. The aspirants for the SSU, existing or external candidates (new), are required to pass a certain set of assessments which are aimed at determining their suitability and fitness. The maximum age limit for existing police personnel is 45 years, and 35 years for officers and soldiers respectively, while for the external candidates, the age limit is 28 years. The standard height required for external male and female candidates is 5’.6" and 5’.4" respectively; however, candidates with greater height and built-up physique are given preference.

The National Testing Service (NTS) conducts the screening test to recruit the new candidates that made the process transparent. After the NTS test, the selected candidates appear in the physical and psychological test. Further, the interviews are conducted to check the suitability and competency of the selected candidates.

Training
After the completion of the recruitment process, the recruited police personnel join the SSU. The personnel are sent to specified training institution for training course to enhance an integrated response mechanism against terrorism at National level. The training programs are initiated at the Shaheed Benazir Bhutto Elite Police Training Center Razzakabad, Karachi through the Police personnel appointments, and are advanced to the anti-terrorism unit. The following Courses are taken by the personnel:

Elite Police Course (Police Commando Course), follow a similar training module like of Pakistan Army's Special Services Group (SSG)
VIP Protection Course

Uniform
The SSU personnel wear a black outfit, protective gears, and M-4 rifle. The regular SSU uniform consists of black trouser and full-sleeve shirt, black barrette representing the SSU logo and DMS shoes. The shirt is ornamented with the rank and training badge, and arm badge of the SSU placed on the upper part of the left sleeve. The operational uniform of the SSU comprises black trouser, black T-shirt or polo shirt with SSU logo printed on the front left side, along with the name of the unit  the back side, P-Cap displaying SSU logo and DMS shoes. All SSU personnel wear a bulletproof jacket, helmet, and other body protective gears when on operational duty.

Activities
SSU had played an active role in counterterrorism and special operations in Pakistan. Incident in which it was involved included:

June 2014, a multi-agency operation against Islamic Movement of Uzbekistan, at Karachi Airport.

Equipment
 Glock series Pistol
 Beretta 92FS Pistol
 Benelli M4 Shotgun
 Heckler & Koch MP5 SMG 
 M4 Carbine Assault Rifle
 Type 56 Assault Rifle
 Beretta ARX160 Assault Rifle
 HK G3 Assault Rifle
 PSR-90 Sniper Rifle
 MG3 Machine Gun
 POF Eye
 Shotguns
 Hand Grenades 
 Smoke Grenades
 Binoculars
 Night vision goggles
And other protective gears.

Initiatives

The SSU established Pakistan's first SWAT team. As of 2016, 50 specialized police personnel (commandos) have been trained to support the efforts of police in critical situations.

Public training
In 2015, the SSU established the Hostile Environment Awareness Training (HEAT) program, intended to teach civilians how to respond during terrorist attacks.

References

External links
 Official Website of Special Security Unit
 SSU Sindh Police Web TV Live

Provincial law enforcement agencies of Pakistan
Police special forces of Pakistan